Kentucky Alleyne Provincial Park is a provincial park in British Columbia. The park is located 38 kilometres south of Merritt, British Columbia.

History
The park was established March 5, 1981. The park is nearly surrounded by the 115-year-old Douglas Lake Ranch, Canada's largest cattle ranch.

Geography
The park is 190 hectares in size. Several kettle lakes, eskers and fluvial outwash deposits are solid evidence of the glacial activity that formed the landscape. Rolling grasslands and dry open forest with some large, mature Douglas fir and Ponderosa pine surround the sparkling turquoise waters of Kentucky Lake and Alleyne Lake.

The park features 58 vehicle-accessible campsites and 1 group campsite.

Conservation
Ecosystem: aspen trees and juniper shrubs
Birds: goldeneye, mallards, teal, grebe, hawks and falcons.
Wildlife: jack rabbits and ground squirrels

Recreation
The following recreational activities are available: vehicle accessible camping, motorized boating, canoeing, kayaking, and fishing (the lakes are stocked with rainbow trout).

See also
List of British Columbia Provincial Parks
List of Canadian provincial parks

References

External links

Kentucky Alleyne Provincial Park
Kentucky Lake Hiking Trail

Provincial parks of British Columbia
Nicola Country
1981 establishments in British Columbia
Protected areas established in 1981